Regina University is a provincial electoral district for the Legislative Assembly of Saskatchewan, Canada. It was first contested in the 2016 election.

The district was created from parts of Regina South, Regina Douglas Park and Regina Wascana Plains.

Members of the Legislative Assembly

Election results

References

Saskatchewan provincial electoral districts
Politics of Regina, Saskatchewan